Janet Mary Riemenschneider-Kemp  (born 12 March 1949) is a New Zealand poet, short story writer and public performer of her work. She lives in Kronberg im Taunus, Germany.

Early life 
Kemp was born in Hamilton in 1949.

Education 
Kemp graduated from the University of Auckland with an MA in English in 1974. She gained a Diploma in Teaching from Auckland Teachers' College in 1972, and RSA Certificate, British Council, Hong Kong (Teacher of English as a Foreign Language) in 1984.

Career 
Kemp began working with the poetry magazine The Word is Freed (usually abbreviated to Freed) in the late 1960s. Freed ran from 1968 to 1973, and emerged from the University of Auckland.

In winter 1979, Kemp toured New Zealand as the only woman in the 'Gang of Four', with Sam Hunt, Alistair Campbell and Hone Tuwhare. Kemp was described at the time as "Jan Kemp, the youngest - and prettiest? - of the four poets on tour."

Kemp worked as a teacher of English as a foreign language at the University of Papua, Papua New Guinea (1980–1982), the University of Hong Kong (1982–1985), and the National University of Singapore (1985). In 1980, Kemp was the Queen Elizabeth II Arts Council Poetry Representative at the South Pacific Festival of Arts in Papua, Papua New Guinea.

Kemp was the chief instigator of the Aotearoa New Zealand Poetry Sound Archive, launched in 2004. The archive is housed in the Special Collections at the University of Auckland Library and in the Alexander Turnbull Library, and features recordings of 171 New Zealand poets reading their work, and is accompanied by text files, photographs and bibliographical notes about the poets.

In 2007, Kemp moved to Germany with her husband, Dieter Riemenschneider.

In Poetry New Zealand issue 48, Kemp discusses her poetic practice:My view of how I write hasn’t really changed since I first wrote of this in the anthology The Young New Zealand Poets (1973) [...] I still hear a line or lines or just a phrase in my head and have taught myself to listen, to let the words keep on coming; I chant them aloud, to remember them, say if out walking; when I can get to paper and pencil, I write them down. Later, I type them up into a text and spend time finessing them. I do the thinking work then, once I’ve seen what I’ve said or am trying to say. A poem can take years or a moment to write itself. The music or cadence of the line and its rhythm are of utter importance to me— the speaking voice of the poet in me who, if I’m lucky, sometimes speaks up.

Publications

Publications as author 
The Young New Zealand Poets (1973), published by Arthur Baysting - Kemp was the only woman among nineteen poets from the Freed group.

Against the Softness of Woman (1976) published by Caveman Press.

Diamonds and Gravel (1979) published by Hampson Hunt.

The Other Hemisphere: Poems (1992) published by Three Continents Press, Washington, DC.

Ice-breaker Poems (1980) (pamphlet) published by Coal Black Press.

Five Poems (1988) published by National Museum Art Gallery Singapore.

Only One Angel: Poems (2001) published by University of Otago Press.

The Sky's Enormous Jug - Love Poems Old & New (2002) published by Puriri Press.

Dante's Heaven (2003), published by Puriri Press. Translated into German by Dieter Riemenschneider and published as Dantes Himmel in 2012. Translated into Italian by Aldo Magnanino and published as Il Cielo di Dante in 2016.

Nine Poems from Le Château de Lavigny (2010) published by Puriri Press.

Voicetracks (2012) published by Puriri Press and Tranzlit.

Jennet's Poem: Wild Love (2012) published by Puriri Press.

Publications as editor 
New Zealand Poets Read Their Work (1974) published by Waiata Recordings.

Classic New Zealand Poets in Performance (Auckland University Press, 2006).

Contemporary NZ Poets in Performance (Auckland University Press, 2007).

New New Zealand Poets in Performance (Auckland University Press, 2008).

Honours and awards 
In 1991, Kemp was awarded a PEN-Stout Fellowship at Victoria University of Wellington.

In the 2005 Queen's Birthday Honours, Kemp was appointed a Member of the New Zealand Order of Merit, for services to literature.

In 2008, Kemp was a Writer in Residence at the Chateau de Lavigny, Switzerland.

Further reading 
Listen to Kemp's poetry recordings on The Poetry Archive.

References 

1949 births
Living people
New Zealand poets
New Zealand women poets
University of Auckland alumni
Members of the New Zealand Order of Merit
People from Hamilton, New Zealand
New Zealand expatriates in Germany